Shri Vidyadhisha Tirtha (died 1631), was an Indian philosopher, scholar, theologian, saint and dialectician. He served as the sixteenth pontiff of Uttaradi Math from 1619 to 1631. He is considered to be one of the important stalwarts in the history of Dvaita school of thought on account of his sound elucidations of the works of Madhvacharya, Jayatirtha and Vyasatirtha. He is also the most celebrated pontiff of Uttaradi Math after Padmanabha Tirtha, Jayatirtha and Raghuttama Tirtha.

Born into a Deshastha Brahmin family of scholars, Vidyadhisha started pursuing the knowledge of Mīmāṃsā, Vyakhyana and Vedanta at very early age. Before becoming the pontiff of Uttaradi Math, he was an accomplished scholar and logician. He composed 10 works, consisting of commentaries on the works of Madhva, Jayatirtha and Vyasatirtha and several independent treatises. His work Vakyartha Chandrika is an elaborate, complicated commentary known for its brilliance.

Biography
Most of the information about Vidyadhisha Tirtha's life is derived from hagiographies - Gurucaryā and Vidyadhisha Vijaya. He was born as Narasimhacharya in a Pandurangi family of scholars to Anandacharya or Ananda Bhattaraka, who was an erudite scholar in Nyaya, Vedanta, Mimamsa, Vyakarana and a disciple of Raghuttama Tirtha of Uttaradi Math. The family belongs to Vashista gotra. Narasimha received all his instructions in Vyakarana, Nyaya and other branches under his own father, Ananda Bhattarka. He was married early and settled in Puntamba, to teaching. He is reported to have defeated many learned scholars of his village  like Tama Bhatta, Golinga Shivabhatta, Vishva Pandita and others in Tarka and Vyakarana. After his father's death, he moved off to Nashik and Tryambak on account of fear of Muslim depredations on his town. Narasimha lived for eight years at Sangamner  and Paithan and thence moved down to Pandharpur and then to Bijapur where he defeated Narasa Pandita. His learning and achievements attracted Vedavyasa Tirtha of Uttaradi Math , who honoured him with presents  and invited him to Mannur on the Bhima River, where he was persuaded to take  orders and was ordained a monk under the name Vidyadhisha. The main incidents in Vidyadhisha's pontifical career were his disputations with Rangoji Bhatta and his tour of south and north of India. He visited Dhanushkoti, Madurai, Srirangam, Tiruchirappalli, Thanjavur, Kumbhakonam, Kanchi, Dharmapuri and Udupi in south. His northern tour included Benares and Gaya where he converted whole community of Gayawalas to the religion of Madha. This great historic  event has given the school of Madhvacharya followers from among important section of Hindi-speaking Brahmins of the North India. The Gayawalas ever since remained staunch followers of Madhva, oving allegiance to Uttaradi Math. The Gurucharya place this event in 1630. Later he visited Badri and on his way back from there, passed away, in 1631, at Ekachakranagaram, in the Ganga-Yamuna daob, where his tomb was consecrated by his successor. The descendants of Vidyadhisha family have subsequently installed his image in Tuminakatte near Ranebennur  where they celebrate his anniversary, every year, as the original Brindavana of Ekachakranagara could not be located.

Works
The number of extant works ascribed to Vidyadhisha Tirtha are ten in number. There are five commentaries and five independent works ascribed to him.

Commentaries

Independent works

References

Bibliography

Further reading

Vidyadheesa Vijaya by Janardhana Suri (Sanskrit)
Sri Vidyadhisha Tirthara Kuritada Kritigalu by Indiresha Dasa (Kannada)

External links
Vidyadhisha Tirtha from https://www.uttaradimath.org/.

Madhva religious leaders
Dvaita Vedanta
Dvaitin philosophers
Scholars from Karnataka
History of Karnataka
Uttaradi Math